Lioglyphostoma antillarum is a species of sea snail, a marine gastropod mollusk in the family Pseudomelatomidae, the turrids and allies.

Description
The length of the shell varies between 6 mm and 12 mm.

Distribution
This marine species occurs in the West Indies; also on the Mid-Atlantic Ridge

References

External links
 Rosenberg G., Moretzsohn F. & García E. F. (2009). Gastropoda (Mollusca) of the Gulf of Mexico, Pp. 579–699 in Felder, D.L. and D.K. Camp (eds.), Gulf of Mexico–Origins, Waters, and Biota. Biodiversity. Texas A&M Press, College Station, Texas
 
 Gastropods.com: Lioglyphostoma antillarum
 da Silva, Gutembergue Francisco, and José Carlos Nascimento de Barros. "SISTEMÁTICA DOS TURRIDAE SWAINSON, 1840 (MOLLUSCA, GASTROPODA) COLIGIDOS DA PLATAFORMA CONTINENTAL DO NORDESTE DO BRASIL."

antillarum
Gastropods described in 1842